CR2 may refer to:

 CR2 battery, a dry-cell type battery commonly used in cameras
 CR2, a raw image format used by Canon digital cameras
 CR2, a postcode district in the CR postcode area
 CR2, a collaboration of the two DJS Mike van der Viven & Ramon Zenker, known for their house single I Believe
 CR2, a radio station in Hong Kong broadcast by CRHK
 Crossroads Mall (Mumbai), a mall in India
 Challenger 2, a British Main Battle Tank
 Celebrity Rehab 2, a reality television show
 CR2 (company), an Irish-based fintech company
 Camp Rock 2: The Final Jam, the sequel to the Disney Channel Original Movie Camp Rock
 Chromium (II) ions
 Bombardier CRJ100/200, the IATA code for the regional airliner.
 Aviation Park MRT station, Singapore, station code CR2

Biological/Medical terms
 Complement receptor 2, an immunological cell surface receptor for a complement component
 Conserved Region 2, the second conserved region in some proteins; see Braf

See also
 2CR (disambiguation)
 CRR (disambiguation)
 CR (disambiguation)
 CRCR (disambiguation)